Johan Magnus Holmberg (born 23 September 1961) is a Swedish Olympic sailor that represented Sweden at the 1984, 1992, and 1996 Summer Olympics. In 1992, he finished 5th together with his crew of Björn Alm and Johan Barne in the Soling class.

He sailed for Victory Challenge in the 2003 and 2007 Louis Vuitton Cups.

References

Swedish male sailors (sport)
Olympic sailors of Sweden
Royal Gothenburg Yacht Club sailors
Sailors at the 1984 Summer Olympics – 470
Sailors at the 1992 Summer Olympics – Soling
Sailors at the 1996 Summer Olympics – Soling
1961 births
Living people
2007 America's Cup sailors
2003 America's Cup sailors
Sportspeople from Gothenburg
20th-century Swedish people